Willie Jones may refer to:

Sports
Willie Jones (American football) (born 1957), former American football player with the Oakland Raiders
Willie Jones (third baseman) (1925–1983), American Major League Baseball player
Willie Jones (catcher) (1902–?), American Negro leagues baseball player
Willie Jones (basketball player) (born 1936), former NBA player for the Detroit Pistons
Willie Jones (basketball coach), American college basketball coach for North Carolina A&T
Willie Jones (cricketer) (1916–1996), Welsh cricketer
Hutch Jones (Willie D. Jones, born 1959), former NBA player for the San Diego Clippers

Music
Willie Jones (drummer) (1929–1991), American drummer
Willie Jones III (born 1968), American musician and drummer
Willie Jones (blues singer) (born 1936), American blues singer
Willie Jones (pianist) (1920–1977), American pianist and bandleader

Other
Willie Jones (statesman) (1740–1801), North Carolina delegate to the Continental Congress

See also
Will Jones (disambiguation)
William Jones (disambiguation)
Billy Jones (disambiguation)
Bill Jones (disambiguation)